Out There is a drama television series produced by Sesame Workshop and Noggin LLC for the Noggin channel. It aired as part of Noggin's nighttime programming block, The N. When the show started development, Sesame Workshop co-owned Noggin, and Out There was launched as a tween-oriented project for the network. The show was written, produced, and commissioned in New York, and it originated as an entirely American series with a storyline set in New York. During development, it became an American-Australian co-production (then titled Two Down Under), and filming took place mostly in Australia.

The show's plot mirrors its co-development between the United States and Australia. It follows the trials and tribulations of an American high school boy named Reilly (Douglas Smith), who moves to Australia from Connecticut as his father flees the authorities. He stays with his aunt and uncle, who are the owners of a nature reserve and veterinary clinic. Reilly befriends his co-worker Aggie (Jade Ewen), a local boy named Miller (Richard Wilson), and the girl next door, Fiona (Molly McCaffrey).

The series premiered on Noggin on May 23, 2003, as the inaugural show of a scheduling event called "Summer in The N." The first four episodes were shown as a two-hour series premiere, and the remainder of the first season aired on Fridays at 9 p.m. in June and July 2003. The show ran for two seasons and 26 episodes in total. It aired its final new episode on July 1, 2004, with reruns continuing throughout the year.

Production
The show's concept was developed by Sesame Workshop and Noggin, both headquartered in New York. The show's plot started out as a "purely North American concept set in New York," without any Australian elements. It began production when the Noggin channel was co-owned and jointly operated by Nickelodeon and Sesame Workshop.

When the show was pitched to potential broadcasters overseas, two buyers—the ABC in Australia and the BBC in Britain—wanted to see the story regionalized so that it would appeal to viewers in their respective regions. The crew "went back to the drawing board" and revised the concept, turning the main character Reilly from an average American into an American displaced in Australia. The character of Aggie was added to hold appeal to British audiences. Both the ABC and the BBC provided funding for the show.

The show was first announced under the working title Two Down Under, which refers to two outsiders moving "down under" to Australia. The show aired as part of The N, a nighttime block on the Noggin channel for tween and teen-oriented shows. The show was specifically aimed at 9- to 13-year-olds, and it was marketed as a "tween drama."

According to executive producer Claire Henderson, accurately representing the American and British characters was easy, while faithfully depicting Australia was more difficult. She said, "Now this actually naturally worked with Reilly being the American and Aggie coming over from Britain. But you have to make sure also that Australia is represented as something that Australian kids can relate to and not some sort of false identity that might suit the other partners."

Synopsis
In the series, Reilly moves from Greenwich, Connecticut to work with his aunt and uncle, Ellen (Genevieve Hegney) and Jonathan (David Roberts) in Australia. He is joined at the clinic by a girl named Aggie Thackery (Jade Ewen), an intern from England. She is initially annoyed at his stubborn demeanor, but grows to like him. Reilly also makes friends with an eccentric local boy, Miller McKee (Richard Wilson), and the girl next door, Fiona McDaniels (Molly McCaffrey), who both work at the clinic. In the first season, Miller is repeatedly turned down by Aggie, who does not yet return his strong feelings for her.

In the second season, Reilly returns to America and is not seen for the remainder of the series. A supposed intern from Texas named Tom (Cody Kasch) arrives, hoping for a "new start," only to be discovered as a fraud and almost sent back to America. This season also adds three new supporting characters: the captain of Aggie's Netball team, Alice (Ashleigh Murray), who has secret affections for Miller, Gregor Krauss (Sean Kennedy), Aggie's short-lived love interest, and Miller's newfound stray dog, Hendrix.

Cast

Main
Douglas Smith – Reilly Evans (season 1)
Cody Kasch – Tom Butler (season 2)
Genevieve Hegney – Ellen Archer
David Roberts – Jonathan Archer
Jade Ewen – Aggie Thackery
Richard Wilson – Miller McKee
Molly McCaffrey – Fiona McDaniel

Recurring
Rebecca Jones – Sam McKee
Ashleigh Murray – Alice O'Connor
Sean Kennedy – Gregor Krauss

Awards
The series was nominated for several Australian Film Institute (AFI) Awards. Director Stephen Maxwell Johnson's direction of the episode "Reilly Had A Little Goat" was nominated for Best Direction in 2003, and the series was nominated for Best Children's Television Drama in both 2003 and 2004, and won in 2003. It was nominated for a Logie Award in the Most Outstanding Children's Program category in 2004 and 2005, winning in 2005. A script for one of the episodes was nominated for a Writers Guild of America award in 2004.

References

External links
Out There on The N (archive)
Out There at the National Film and Sound Archive
 

2003 American television series debuts
2003 Australian television series debuts
2004 American television series endings
2004 Australian television series endings
2000s American teen drama television series
Australian children's television series
Australian drama television series
English-language television shows
The N original programming
Television series about teenagers
Television series by Sesame Workshop
Television shows set in Sydney